The 1973–74 Swedish Division I season was the 30th season of Swedish Division I. Leksands IF won the league title by finishing first in the final round.

First round

Northern Group

Southern Group

Qualification round

Final round

External links
 1973–74 season

Swedish
Swedish Division I seasons
1973–74 in Swedish ice hockey